Kamra may refer to:

 Kamra (surname)
 Kamra, Pakistan, a town in Attock District, Punjab
 PAC Kamra (Pakistan Aeronautical Complex), in the town
 Kamra Air Base (PAF Base Minhas), in the town
 Kamra Cantonment, adjacent to the airbase